Poland has submitted films for the Academy Award for Best International Feature Film on a regular basis since 1963. The Oscar is handed out annually by the United States Academy of Motion Picture Arts and Sciences to a feature-length motion picture produced outside the United States that contains primarily non-English dialogue. It was not created until the 1956 Academy Awards, in which a competitive Academy Award of Merit, known as the Best Foreign Language Film Award, was created for non-English speaking films, and has been given annually since.

Submissions
The Academy of Motion Picture Arts and Sciences has invited the film industries of various countries to submit their best film for the Academy Award for Best Foreign Language Film since 1956. The Foreign Language Film Award Committee oversees the process and reviews all the submitted films. Following this, they vote via secret ballot to determine the five nominees for the award.

, 54 Polish films have been submitted for the award. Thirteen of these submissions resulted in nominations for the Best Foreign Language Film Oscar, with Ida winning in 2015. Below is a list of the films that have been submitted by Poland for review by the Academy for the award by year and the respective Academy Awards ceremony.

See also
Cinema of Poland
List of Polish films

Notes

References

Poland
Lists of Polish films